Küçükköyspor is a sports club located in Istanbul, Turkey.

External links
Küçükköyspor on TFF.org

 
Football clubs in Istanbul
Association football clubs established in 1968
1968 establishments in Turkey